Vavau is a small village on south east end of Upolu island in Samoa. The village is part of the Lotofaga Electoral Constituency (Faipule District) which is within the larger political district of Atua.

The population is 380.

Before the 2009 tsunami, Vavau had a beach resort which was a popular getaway for locals on weekends and was also visited by overseas tourists. Now Vavau Beach is now deserted, but it is still accessible.

References

Populated places in Atua (district)